is a Japanese actress, singer and model from Hodogaya-ku, Yokohama, Kanagawa Prefecture. Goriki has Japanese and Filipino ancestry. She was represented by the talent agency Oscar Promotion until 2020.

Career

As an actress
Ayame Goriki liked to stand out when she was young. When she was in elementary school, she told her parents that she wanted to become a model. At the age of 7 she had a professional photographer take a snapshot at an amusement park, for a magazine, which lead her to becoming a model. Goriki also participated in the 8th Japan Beautiful Girl Contest in 2002, but did not progress past the second round. While at the event, she was recruited by the Japanese talent agency Oscar Promotion.

From February 2008 to May 2013, she worked as an exclusive model for the fashion magazine Seventeen.

In January 2011, she appeared on the Fuji TV monthly drama Taisetsu na Koto wa Subete Kimi ga Oshiete Kureta. To play the role, she changed her appearance noticeably by growing her hair long. In some profiles, Taisetsu na Koto wa Subete Kimi ga Oshiete Kureta is listed as her debut work. However, her official debut work is ChocoMimi (TV Tokyo), premiering in 2007. In July of the same year, she starred in a TV drama "Cosmic Star" for TV Tokyo's IS.

Since then, she has appeared in commercials for Mister Donut, Sekisui House, and Lunch Pack (Yamazaki Baking). In November 2011, Nikkei Trendy selected her as "Face of the Year".

Goriki starred in a TV drama for the first time, appearing on Biblia Koshodō no Jiken Techō (Fuji TV), which started on January 14, 2013.

In 2016, she performed live for the first time in the Meiji-za November performance of Sisters of the Gion.

As a voice actress
In 2012, she voiced Elizabeth Shaw in the movie Prometheus. In 2014, she also voiced Mystique in X-Men: Days of Future Past.

As a singer
In February 2013, she debuted as a singer in June 2013 with the song . Prior to the release of the CD on July 10, it was used as a Yamazaki Baking Lunch Pack CM song.

Filmography

TV dramas
 ChocoMimi (TV Tokyo, 2007–2008), Bambi (Mori Kojika)
 Battery (NHK, 2008), Ai Asakura
 Love Letter (TBS, 2008–2009), Yoko Ochi (teen)
 Taisetsu na Koto wa Subete Kimi ga Oshiete Kureta (Fuji TV, 2011), Nozomi Sonoda
 Koi Suru Nihongo (NHK, 2011), Nanaka
 Tōi Hi no Yukue (WOWOW, 2011), Reika Miyawaki
 Asukō March: Asuka Kōgyō Kōkō Monogatari (TV Asahi, 2011), Momo Aizawa
 IS (TV Tokyo, 2011), Miwako Aihara
 The Reason I Can't Find My Love (Fuji TV, 2011, ep2-4,7,9-10), Momoko Hanzawa
 Teen Court: 10-dai Saiban (NTV, 2012), Misato Niyakouji
 Hissatsu Shigotonin 2012 (TV Asahi, 2012), Oharu
 W's Tragedy (TV Asahi, 2012), Sayaka Mido
 Mirai Nikki - Another: World (Fuji TV, 2012), Yuno Furusaki
 Beginners! (TBS, 2012), Hiro Momoe
 Irodori Himura Episode 1 (TBS, 2012), Yui
 Yae no Sakura (NHK, 2013), Yuki Hinata(Yuki Naitō)
 Biblia Koshodō no Jiken Techō (Fuji TV, 2013), Shioriko Shinokawa
 Kurokōchi (TBS, 2013), Mayo Seike
 Watashi no Kirai na Tantei (TV Asahi, 2014), Akemi Ninomiya
 Asunaro San San Nana Byōshi (Fuji TV, 2014), Saya Matsushita
 Kindaichi Kōsuke vs Akechi Kogorō Futatabi (Fuji TV, 2014), Hoshiko Ryūjō
 Legal High Special (Fuji TV, 2014)
 Taishi Kakka no Ryōrinin (Fuji TV, 2015), Ray Tee Lan
 Kuroi Gashū (TV Tokyo, 2015), Ai Numada
 Tenshi to Akuma: Mikaiketsu Jiken Tokumei Kōshōka (TV Asahi, 2015), Hikari Maita
 Gu.ra.me! (TV Asahi, 2016), Kurumi Ichiki
Rental Lover | Rental no Koi (TBS / 2017) - Remi Takasugi
Joshu Seven (TV Asahi / 2017) - Kotone Kamiwatari
Face Cyber Hanzai Tokusouhan (Amazone / 2017)
Kaseifu no Mitazono Season 2 (TV Asahi / 2018) - Makoto Gomi

TV movies
 Torihada (Fuji TV, 2007–2009)
 Samayoi Zakura (Fuji TV, 2009), Hamachiyo Anri (defence witness)
 Ghost Town no Hana (2009)
 Honto ni Atta Kowai Hanashi: Natsu no Tokubetsuhen 2012 - Norowareta Byōshitsu (Fuji TV, 2012), Airi Sano
 Honto ni Atta Kowai Hanashi 15-shūnen Special (Fuji TV, 2014), Rina Sasaoka

Films
 Gekijo-ban: Kaidan Restaurant (2010), Jun Takase
 Onīchan no Hanabi (2010), Hiromi Hayase
 Quartet! (2012), Misaki Nagae
 Gatchaman (2013), Jun Ōtsuki
 The Kiyosu Conference (2013), Matsuhime
 Black Butler (2014), Shiori Genpō (Kiyoharu)
 L DK (2014), Aoi Nishimori
 End-of-Life Concierge (2021)
 Dekotora no Shu 6 (2021)
 Tears of Persephone (2022)
 Detective of Joshidaikoji (2023)

Anime
Pretty Cure All Stars New Stage 3: Eternal Friends (2014), Nami

Video games
Rhythm Thief & the Emperor’s Treasure (2012), Marie/Maria

Dubbing
Prometheus (2012), Elizabeth Shaw (Noomi Rapace)
X-Men: Days of Future Past, Raven Darkhölme / Mystique (Jennifer Lawrence)

Radio shows
 Ayame Gouriki Smile Smile! (Nippon Broadcasting System, 2012), host
 Girls Locks! (Tokyo FM, 2012–2015)

Discography

Singles

Bibliography

Magazines
 Seventeen, Shueisha 1967-, as an exclusive model from 2008 to 2013

Photobooks
 Shizuku (Shueisha, 25 November 2011) 
 Ayame Gouriki (Wani Books, 26 August 2012) 
 Yoaki no Spica: Spica at Day Break (Wani Books, 27 June 2014)

Awards

2011
 The Best of Beauty 2011
 Nikkei Trendy Face of the Year
 The 2nd Japan Wedding Best Dresser Awards

2012
 The 21st Japanese Film Critics Awards Best Newcomer
 The 25th Japan Glasses Best Dresser: Special Award
 The 34th Kodansha Advertisement Award: Best Character Award
 The 12th Best Leathernist Awards
 Best Smile of the Year 2012 Celebrity Category
 Vogue Japan Women of the Year 2012
 The 41st Best Dresser Awards Entertainment Category
 Best Beautist Award 2012 Actress Category

2013
 The 24th Japan Jewelry Best Dresser Awards: 20s Category
 The 18th Japan Association of Adult Orthodontics - E-Line Beautiful Award
 The 30th Asakusa Geinō Awards Best Newcomer

2014
 The 10th Best Cool Biz Awards

References

External links 

  
 Official agency profile 
 
 
 Ayame Goriki on Sony Music Entertainment Japan 

1992 births
Living people
Actresses from Yokohama
Gr8! Records artists
Japanese television actresses
Japanese female models
Japanese female idols
Japanese television presenters
Japanese women television presenters
Japanese video game actresses
Japanese voice actresses
Voice actresses from Yokohama
21st-century Japanese singers
21st-century Japanese women singers